The 1958/59 NTFL season was the 38th season of the Northern Territory Football League (NTFL).

St Marys have won their third premiership title while defeating the Buffaloes in the grand final by 80 points.

Grand Final

References 

Northern Territory Football League seasons
NTFL